The Luka State are an English indie rock band from Winsford, Cheshire, England. It comprises members Conrad Ellis, Sam Bell, Jake Barnabas, and Lewis Pusey. The band are signed to Thirty Tigers [Worldwide].

Career
In 2013, the band released three singles: "Matter of Time," "30 Minute Break," and "Rain;" all three being recorded by Sam Williams, best known for discovering Alternative rock band Supergrass. They were picked up by Vulture Hound, which called the group "the epitome of modern Rock-n-roll."

In 2014, Whitmore parted with founding members Ellis and Bell, the latter citing musical differences and leaving room for Jake Barnabas as drummer. This change coincided with a change to a more electronically enhanced sound, described by Clash as "all epic guitars and contagious synth lines".

The band were invited on tour with One Night Only (band) in 2015 and so the band expanded, with Guitarist Lewis Pusey joining January of that year. His first performance with the band was on set in London at the recording of The Believer music video.

In 2017 The Luka State started writing music for their debut album, which would become Fall In Fall Out, in their Winsford rehearsal space whilst touring extensively across the UK and internationally.

The band self funded the recording of Fall In Fall Out at The Pool studio in London between October 2017 and August 2018 with producer Jamie Evans. Additionally the track Bold was produced by Simon Edwards, formerly the bassist of Fairground Attraction and Billy Bragg’s touring band, in his home studio.

Alan Moulder (producer of U2, Arctic Monkeys, Nine Inch Nails) and Mike Cave (who had worked with Lewis Capaldi) mixed the majority of the record, with Catherine Marks Mixing Bold and Tarek Musa Mixing What’s My Problem. 

The band originally planned to self release the album before signing to NYC based record label Anti Fragile in December 2019, and then signing to Shelter Music / BMG across Europe in November 2020.

In May 2022 the band launched what will be their next album campaign, with the single "Bring Us Down" released alongside announcing their first headline tour of North America, planned for autumn 2022, following UK touring that begins at Two Thousand Trees Festival. The band's next album release details are still unknown.

Football collaborations
Their song Bring This All Together was featured in the game Dream League Soccer 2018. The song was also used by broadcasters Sky Sports across Europe 350 times a day, gaining the attention of music industry magazine Music Week which ran an article on the band's sync placement.

Another song, Kick In The Teeth, was featured in Dream League Soccer 2019.

The band's music has been frequently played at football grounds across the UK, including at Manchester United F.C's home ground Old Trafford, as part of the pre-game warm up entertainment.

In November 2018, The Luka State performed live at Wembley Stadium's fan zone ahead of the England Vs Croatia match being played that day.

Their song, Bring Us Down was also featured on Dream League Soccer 2023.

Discography

Singles
Matter Of Time - (December 2013)
30 Minute Break - (March 2014)
Rain - (July 2014)
The Believer - (March 2015)
Can’t Help Myself - (June 2015)
Lies! Lies! Lies! - (Jan 2017)
Bring This All Together (Re Release) - (May 2017)
Bury Me - (September 2018)
Kick In The Teeth - (December 2018)
What’s My Problem - (January 2019)
Fake News - (January 2020)
[Insert Girls Name Here] - (March 2020)
Feel It - (May 2020)
Room’s On Fire - (May 2020)
Real Thing - (June 2020)
Bold - (July 2020)
Feel It (Tarek Musa Mix) - (November 2020)
Fall In Fall Out [SINGLE] - (January 2021)
Oxygen Thief - (Jan 2022)
Bring us Down - (May 2022)

EPs
The Price of Education [EP] - (8 June 2015)
Demos [EP] - (4 November 2016)
A Taste Of Things To Come [EP] - (10 May 2019)

Albums
Fall In Fall Out - (29 January 2021)
More Than This - (10 March 2023)

References

External links
The Luka State Official site

English indie rock groups
Musical groups from Cheshire